Roy Budiansyah (born on July 17, 1990) is an Indonesian footballer who currently plays for Persiba Balikpapan in the Indonesia Super League.

References

External links

1990 births
Association football defenders
Living people
Indonesian footballers
Liga 1 (Indonesia) players
Persita Tangerang players
Persiba Balikpapan players
21st-century Indonesian people